Quentin S. "Q" Williams (November 24, 1983 – January 5, 2023) was an American politician of the Democratic Party. He was a member of the Connecticut House of Representatives, representing the 100th district in Middlesex County from 2019 until his death in 2023.

Career 
In 2007, he was elected to the Middletown, Connecticut Planning & Zoning Commission.  Williams was unanimously made chair of the commission two years later. Williams was elected as Middletown Treasurer in 2011 and re-elected in 2015.

He was the director of policy and advocacy for Excellence Community Schools, a charter school system in Stamford, Connecticut.

Williams was elected to the Connecticut House of Representatives in 2018 winning 61% of the vote over 39% for Republican candidate Anthony Gennaro. He was re-elected in 2020 and 2022. During the legislature's 2021–22 session, he co-chaired the committees on aging and housing. At the start of the 2023–24 session, he was set to co-chair the labor committee. Williams was noted for his focus on housing issues. In 2022, he authored a bill, which was successfully passed into law, leading to the formation of commissions to mediate disputes between tenants and renters in all Connecticut municipalities with a population of over 25,000.

Personal life 
Born Quentin Phipps, he changed his surname to Williams, his mother's last name, in 2022. Williams was a graduate of Bryant University, where he studied business, and Villanova University, where he received a master's degree in public administration. At the time of his death, he was enrolled at the Harvard Kennedy School.

Williams lived in Middletown with his wife, the former Carrissa Phillippe. He was a member of the Cross Street Zion AME Church in Middletown.

Death 
On January 4, 2023, Williams was sworn in for his third term in the legislature and attended inaugural festivities for reelected governor Ned Lamont in Hartford that evening. At 12:48 a.m. on January 5, Williams was driving southbound on Connecticut Route 9 in Cromwell when a northbound vehicle entered the lane and struck his car head-on. Williams and the northbound driver both died at the scene.

Electoral history

References 

1983 births
2023 deaths
21st-century American politicians
African-American state legislators in Connecticut
Bryant University alumni
City and town treasurers in the United States
Democratic Party members of the Connecticut House of Representatives
Harvard Kennedy School alumni
People of the African Methodist Episcopal church
Politicians from Middletown, Connecticut
Road incident deaths in Connecticut
Villanova University alumni